The Nightmare is a 1781 oil painting by Swiss artist Henry Fuseli. It shows a woman in deep sleep with her arms thrown below her, and with a demonic and ape-like incubus crouched on her chest. The painting's dreamlike and haunting erotic evocation of infatuation and obsession was a huge popular success.

After its first exhibition, at the 1782 Royal Academy of London, critics and patrons reacted with horrified fascination and the work became widely popular, to the extent that it was parodied in political satire and an engraved version was widely distributed. In response, Fuseli produced at least three other versions.

Interpretations vary. The canvas seems to portray simultaneously a dreaming woman and the content of her nightmare. The incubus and horse's head refer to contemporary belief and folklore about nightmares, but have been ascribed more specific meanings by some theorists. Contemporary critics were taken aback by the overt sexuality of the painting, since interpreted by some scholars as anticipating Jungian ideas about the unconscious.

Description 

The Nightmare simultaneously offers both the image of a dream—by indicating the effect of the nightmare on the woman—and a dream image—in symbolically portraying the sleeping vision. It depicts a sleeping woman draped over the end of a bed with her head hanging down, exposing her long neck. She is surmounted by an incubus that peers out at the viewer. The sleeper seems lifeless and, lying on her back, takes a position then believed to encourage nightmares. Her brilliant coloration is set against the darker reds, yellows, and ochres of the background; Fuseli used a chiaroscuro effect to create strong contrasts between light and shade. The interior is contemporary and fashionable and contains a small table on which rests a mirror, phial, and book. The room is hung with red velvet curtains which drape behind the bed. Emerging from a parting in the curtain is the head of a horse with bold, featureless eyes.

For contemporary viewers, the relationship of the incubus and the horse (mare) evoked the notion of nightmares. The work was likely inspired by the waking dreams experienced by Fuseli and his contemporaries, who found that these experiences related to folkloric beliefs like the Germanic tales about demons and witches that possessed people who slept alone. In these stories, men were visited by horses or hags, giving rise to the terms "hag-riding" and "mare-riding", and women were believed to engage in sex with the devil. The etymology of the word "nightmare", however, does not relate to horses. The early meaning of "nightmare" included the sleeper's experience of weight on the chest combined with sleep paralysis, dyspnea, or a feeling of dread. The painting incorporates a variety of imagery associated with these ideas, depicting a mare's head and a demon crouched atop the woman.

Sleep and dreams were common subjects for the Zürich-born Henry Fuseli, though The Nightmare is unique among his paintings for its lack of reference to literary or religious themes (Fuseli was an ordained minister). His first known painting is Joseph Interpreting the Dreams of the Butler and Baker of Pharaoh (1768), and later he produced The Shepherd's Dream (1798) inspired by John Milton's Paradise Lost, and Richard III Visited by Ghosts (1798) based on Shakespeare's play.

Fuseli's knowledge of art history was broad, allowing critics to propose sources for the painting's elements in antique, classical, and Renaissance art. According to art critic Nicholas Powell, the woman's pose may derive from the Vatican Ariadne, and the style of the incubus from figures at Selinunte, an archaeological site in Sicily. A source for the woman in Giulio Romano's The Dream of Hecuba at the Palazzo del Te has also been proposed. Powell links the horse to a woodcut by the German Renaissance artist Hans Baldung or to the marble Horse Tamers on Quirinal Hill, Rome. Fuseli may have added the horse as an afterthought, since a preliminary chalk sketch did not include it. Its presence in the painting has been viewed as a visual pun on the word "nightmare" and a self-conscious reference to folklore—the horse destabilises the painting's conceit and contributes to its Gothic tone.

Exhibition 

The painting is housed at the Detroit Institute of Arts. It was first shown at the Royal Academy of London in 1782, where it "excited … an uncommon degree of interest", according to Fuseli's early biographer and friend John Knowles.

It remained well-known decades later, and Fuseli painted other versions on the same theme. Fuseli sold the original for twenty guineas, and an inexpensive engraving by Thomas Burke circulated widely beginning in January 1783, earning publisher John Raphael Smith more than 500 pounds. The engraving was underscored by a short poem by Erasmus Darwin, "Night-Mare":

Darwin included these lines and expanded upon them in his long poem The Loves of the Plants (1789), for which Fuseli provided the frontispiece:

Interpretation

Contemporary critics often found the work scandalous due to its sexual themes.  A few years earlier Fuseli had fallen for a woman named Anna Landholdt in Zürich, while travelling from Rome to London. Landholdt was the niece of his friend, the Swiss physiognomist Johann Kaspar Lavater. Fuseli wrote of his fantasies to Lavater in 1779; "Last night I had her in bed with me—tossed my bedclothes hugger-mugger—wound my hot and tight-clasped hands about her—fused her body and soul together with my own—poured into her my spirit, breath and strength. Anyone who touches her now commits adultery and incest! She is mine, and I am hers. And have her I will.…"

Fuseli's marriage proposal met with disapproval from Landholdt's father, and in any case seems to have been unrequited—she married a family friend soon after. The Nightmare, then, can be seen as a personal portrayal of the erotic aspects of love lost. Art historian H. W. Janson suggests that the sleeping woman represents Landholdt and that the demon is Fuseli himself. Bolstering this claim is an unfinished portrait of a girl on the back of the painting's canvas, which may portray Landholdt. Anthropologist Charles Stewart characterises the sleeping woman as "voluptuous," and one scholar of the Gothic describes her as lying in a "sexually receptive position." In Woman as Sex Object (1972), Marcia Allentuck similarly argues that the painting's intent is to show female orgasm. This is supported by Fuseli's sexually overt and even pornographic private drawings (e.g., Symplegma of Man with Two Women, 1770–78). Fuseli's painting has been considered representative of sublimated sexual instincts. Related interpretations of the painting view the incubus as a dream symbol of male libido, with the sexual act represented by the horse's intrusion through the curtain. Fuseli himself provided no commentary on his painting.

Both the English word nightmare and its German equivalent, Albtraum (literally, "elf dream"), evoke the image of a malevolent being that causes bad dreams by sitting on the chest of the sleeper.

The Royal Academy exhibition brought Fuseli and his painting enduring fame. The exhibition included Shakespeare-themed works by Fuseli, which won him a commission to produce eight paintings for publisher John Boydell's Shakespeare Gallery. One version of The Nightmare hung in the home of Fuseli's close friend and publisher Joseph Johnson, gracing his weekly dinners for London thinkers and writers. The Nightmare was widely plagiarised, and parodies of it were commonly used for political caricature, by George Cruikshank, Thomas Rowlandson, and others. In these satirical scenes, the incubus afflicts subjects such as Napoleon Bonaparte, Louis XVIII, British politician Charles James Fox, and Prime Minister William Pitt. In another example, admiral Lord Nelson is the demon, and his mistress Emma, Lady Hamilton, the sleeper.

While some observers have viewed the parodies as mocking Fuseli, it is more likely that The Nightmare was simply a vehicle for ridicule of the caricatured subject. The Danish painter, Nicolai Abraham Abildgaard, whom Fuseli had met in Rome, produced his own version of The Nightmare (Danish: Mareridt) which develops on the eroticism of Fuseli's work. Abildgaard's painting shows two naked women asleep in the bed; it is the woman in the foreground who is experiencing the nightmare and the incubus—which is crouched on the woman's stomach, facing her parted legs—has its tail nestling between her exposed breasts.

Fuseli painted other versions of The Nightmare following the success of the first; at least three survive. The other important canvas was painted between 1790 and 1791 and is held at the Goethe Museum in Frankfurt. It is smaller than the original, and the woman's head lies to the left; a mirror opposes her on the right. The demon is looking at the woman rather than out of the picture, and it has pointed, catlike ears. The most significant difference in the remaining two versions is an erotic statuette of a couple on the table.

Legacy

Influence on literature 

The Nightmare likely influenced Mary Shelley in a scene from her famous Gothic novel Frankenstein; or, The Modern Prometheus (1818). Shelley would have been familiar with the painting; her parents, Mary Wollstonecraft and William Godwin, knew Fuseli. The iconic imagery associated with the Creature's murder of the protagonist Victor's wife seems to draw from the canvas: "She was there, lifeless and inanimate, thrown across the bed, her head hanging down, and her pale and distorted features half covered by hair." The novel and Fuseli's biography share a parallel theme: just as Fuseli's incubus is infused with the artist's emotions in seeing Landholdt marry another man, Shelley's monster promises to get revenge on Victor on the night of his wedding. Like Frankenstein's monster, Fuseli's demon symbolically seeks to forestall a marriage.

Edgar Allan Poe may have evoked The Nightmare in his short story "The Fall of the House of Usher" (1839). His narrator compares a painting hanging in Usher's house to a Fuseli work, and reveals that an "irrepressible tremor gradually pervaded my frame; and, at length, there sat upon my heart an incubus of utterly causeless alarm". Poe and Fuseli shared an interest in the subconscious; Fuseli is often quoted as saying, "One of the most unexplored regions of art are dreams".

In the twentieth and twenty-first centuries 

Fuseli's Nightmare reverberated with twentieth-century psychological theorists. In 1926, American writer Max Eastman paid a visit to Sigmund Freud and claimed to have seen a print of The Nightmare displayed next to Rembrandt's The Anatomy Lesson in Freud's Vienna apartment. Psychoanalyst and Freud biographer Ernest Jones chose another version of Fuseli's painting as the frontispiece of his book On the Nightmare (1931); however, neither Freud nor Jones mentioned these paintings in their writings about dreams. Carl Jung included The Nightmare and other Fuseli works in his Man and His Symbols (1964).

Tate Britain held an exhibition titled Gothic Nightmares: Fuseli, Blake and the Romantic Imagination between 15 February and 1 May 2006, with the Nightmare as the central exhibit. The catalogue indicated the painting's influence on films such as the original Frankenstein (1931) and The Marquise of O (1976). Among modern artists, Balthus incorporated elements of The Nightmare in his work (e.g., The Room (1952–54).

Famous drag queen Katya Zamolodchikova released an EP titled Vampire Fitness in November 2020. The EP cover art is a direct reference to The Nightmare, with Katya portraying both the woman and the demon over her body. She even included a horse statue in one corner of the room. It serves as a modern reinterpretation of the painting, with the woman appearing completely nude, except for a pair of sunglasses. 

In January 2023 Martin Rowson produced a cartoon, "after Fuseli (and everyone else)", for The Guardian to comment on the ethical problems of the UK Government, with a Conservative Party majority. The cartoon features Rishi Sunak, Boris Johnson, and Nadhim Zahawi plus a horse with a hot water bottle.

Notes

References

Further reading
 Recent exhibit and publication: Gothic Nightmares: Fuseli, Blake and the Imagination. 15 February–1 May 2006. Tate Britain, London. 
 Jones, E. On the Nightmare. London: Hogarth Press and Institute of Psycho-Analysis, 1931.

External links 

 Essay on this painting from the book Beauty and Terror by Brian A. Oard

1781 paintings
Romantic paintings
Paintings by Henry Fuseli
Horses in art
Paintings in the collection of the Detroit Institute of Arts
Demons in art
Nightmares in fiction